"The Girl in Question" is episode 20 of season 5 in the television show Angel. Written by Steven S. DeKnight and Drew Goddard and directed by David Greenwalt, it was originally broadcast on May 5, 2004 on the WB network. When Angel and Spike go to Italy after hearing Buffy is in trouble, they discover she is dating their long-time nemesis The Immortal. While searching for Buffy - and the head of a demon which must be brought back to L.A. to prevent a demon war - they reminisce about their history with The Immortal and finally accept that they can't control whom Buffy dates.

Plot
Gunn discovers a demon gang war is imminent unless the dead leader's head is recovered from Rome, so Angel and Spike travel to Rome to retrieve the head. They find out that Buffy is dating their nemesis "The Immortal". Flashbacks are shown that explain why Angel and Spike hate "The Immortal": he slept with Darla and Drusilla simultaneously while his minions held Angelus and Spike in chains. They discuss the matter and conclude that Buffy must be under some sort of love spell. Spike and Angel visit Buffy's apartment and find Andrew Wells, who is living with Buffy and Dawn. He says that Buffy went to a club with The Immortal. They go to the club and see Buffy from a distance. They get distracted and leave the demon head in a bag on a table, which is snatched by The Immortal's demon butler. Angel and Spike fight the minions and "accidentally" hit each other a few times, too. The demon butler gets away with the head and leaves.

After arguing over how they would be able to find the head "if they had their resources", Angel and Spike go the Rome Wolfram & Hart offices, where they are greeted by the CEO, an ebullient Italian woman. She says the head is being held in a standard ransom situation. Angel and Spike are given money for the drop, which they exchange with the butler for the bag. They open it and in it is actually a bomb, three seconds from detonation. The two both barely survive the ensuing explosion, albeit with their clothing heavily damaged and the street destroyed. The Rome Wolfram & Hart CEO explains that they always use the bomb on first-timers as a prank, and replaces their damaged clothing, including Spike's "irreplaceable" jacket. After being locked out of her office, Spike and Angel return to Buffy's apartment where Andrew tells them to let Buffy move on, saying that although she loves them both, they need to give her some space and move on themselves or they could never again have any chance to reunite with her. Frustrated by their inability to contact Buffy and by the demon butler's chicanery on The Immortal's behalf, they go home, where they find the head on Angel's desk with a note signed by The Immortal. Though outraged that he "distracted" them again while he put the moves on "their" girl, Angel and Spike realize that they do need to move on.

Meanwhile, at Wolfram & Hart in L.A., Fred's parents show up at Wesley's office where he tries to tell them she has been consumed, only to be interrupted by Illyria who looks and acts exactly like Fred. Later, while her parents are being shown Fred's office, Wesley confronts Illyria. She explains because of Fred's past memories she cannot bear to witness their grief in addition to Wesley's, which she experiences as a physical pain. She explains that she can appear in the form that she wishes. After Fred's parents leave, Illyria continues to appear and speak as Fred, which angers Wesley. She states that she wishes to explore the relationship further and does not understand why Wesley is angry when he obviously loved Fred. He replies that she is not Fred and that he is sickened by the sight of her, and orders her to never assume Fred's form again. As she changes back into her usual form, she appears somewhat confused and upset when he leaves the room.

Production details
This episode was the first time James Marsters met director David Greenwalt, despite working on the second season of Buffy together. "I was just a guest star, and I had no reason to go up to the writers' offices. I didn't go to the gods at that point," says Marsters. He says that Greenwalt is "exceptional" at inspiring actors to perform their best.

Actress Julie Benz says her last appearance as Darla in the flashback scenes of this episode was "a great way for us to... say goodbye to our characters, to be together and to have some fun." She was relieved to shoot such a "playful" scene, "because anything else I think would have been too hard; too difficult; too painful." She adds the sheet she was wrapped in kept snagging on the camera dolly and falling down. "It was a great way to end; flashing everybody!" she says.

Dawn Summers was intended to appear in this episode, but as Michelle Trachtenberg was unavailable for filming, the role of Dawn was rewritten for Andrew Wells.

Writing
It is a commonly held but mistaken belief that the producers sought Sarah Michelle Gellar for this episode. Another actress played Buffy Summers in a faraway shot of her dancing with The Immortal in a nightclub. In fact, the intention of this episode was always that neither Buffy nor the Immortal would be clearly seen. Gellar was actually sought for the penultimate episode "Power Play", but proved unavailable because she was busy finishing the filming of The Grudge. Writer David Fury explains this in an interview with Mike Jozic:

David Greenwalt refers to this episode as "Rosencrantz and Guildenstern go to Rome."

Continuity
The canonical eighth season comic retcons the identity of the Immortal's blonde consort; Buffy (as narrator) says: "The guys figured I was a target. Set up two other Slayers to be me. ... One's in Rome, partying very publicly – and supposedly dating some guy called 'The Immortal.' That part was Andrew's idea. He did research on the guy, said it would be hilarious for some reason" — apparently the reason being a prank aimed at Spike and Angel.
This episode makes reference to Buffy's speech to Angel in "Chosen". Of course, this is not explicitly explained, leaving Spike immensely confused by Angel's seemingly random statement.
Angel: But she's not finished baking yet. I gotta wait till she's done baking, you know, till she finds herself, 'cause that's the drill. Fine. I'm waitin' patiently, and meanwhile, The Immortal's eatin' cookie dough!
Although Angel and Spike have a particularly acrimonious relationship where Buffy is concerned, this adventure (and Buffy having moved on from them both) provides them with somewhat of a bonding experience - they drink together, engage in their most civil dialogue to date, and reminisce about the past. It is also relevant that Andrew, when sending the vampires, mentions that Buffy does love both of them. In the last episode of Buffy the Vampire Slayer, Buffy had told Spike that she loved him, and he had told her "No you don't, but thanks for saying it."
Spike complains about the duster he'd 'ripped off a dead slayer' (Nikki Wood, Slayer from the 1970s and mother of Robin Wood, who appears in the final season of Buffy). Clips of the encounter range through the seasons, most notably 'Lies My Parents Told Me' (Season 7)
This is perhaps the only episode when Angelus is portrayed as anything but a manipulative sociopath, joining Spike as being the target of many comical misfortunes, ranging from their mutual disbelief that Darla and Drusilla had been seduced "concurrently" by the Immortal to suffering the indignity of being denied entrance to one of the Immortal's parties while seeking a 'Blood Vengeance.'
 Along with "Becoming, Part One", "Fool for Love" and "Darla", this is one of only four Buffyverse episodes in which all four members of the Whirlwind (Angel, Spike, Darla and Drusilla) appear.
During their argument over which of them has helped save the world more times, Angel and Spike refer to the events of "Prophecy Girl" and "The Zeppo" (in which Angel helped to close the Hellmouth), "Doomed" and "Chosen" (in which Spike did so), "Graduation Day, Part Two" (in which Angel helped to defeat the Mayor), "Peace Out" (in which Angel Investigations defeated Jasmine) and "Becoming, Part Two" (in which Spike conspired with Buffy Summers so that she could kill Angelus before he could awaken the demon Acathla).

Cultural references
The brief scene in black-and-white of Spike and Drusilla in an Italian jazz club resembles the style of Italian modernist films from the early 1960s by the likes of Fellini and Antonioni.
Andrew is seen wearing a Strong Bad t-shirt from the popular internet website Homestar Runner.
Upon finding out that Buffy is dating The Immortal, Spike declares "It's Worse!", in classic Star Wars style.

References

External links

 

Angel (season 5) episodes
2004 American television episodes
Television episodes set in Rome
Buffyverse crossover episodes
Television episodes written by Drew Goddard